Ephysteris tenuisaccus is a moth of the family Gelechiidae. It is found in Russia (the southern Ural) and on Cyprus. The habitat consists of chalk steppe.

The wingspan is 10.5–12.5 mm. The ground colour of the forewings is pure creamish white with the a dark brown pattern. The hindwings are whitish fuscous, the basal area paler. Adults are on wing in June.

Etymology
The species name is derived from Latin tenuis (meaning thin) and refers to a thin saccus in the male genitalia, one of the characters separating the new species from closely related Ephysteris deserticolella.

References

Moths described in 2010
Ephysteris